Peeter Palovere (1872–?) was an Estonian politician. He was a member of II Riigikogu. He was a member of the Riigikogu since 22 March 1924. He replaced Hans Tirusson. On 12 April 1924, he resigned his position and he was replaced by Juhan Must.

References

1872 births
Year of death missing
Workers' United Front politicians
Members of the Riigikogu, 1923–1926